What a Man! is a 1938 British comedy film directed by Edmond T. Gréville and starring Sydney Howard, Vera Pearce and John Singer. It was made at Beaconsfield Studios in September.

The film's art direction was by Norman G. Arnold.

Cast
 Sydney Howard as Samuel Pennyfeather  
 Vera Pearce as Emily Pennyfeather  
 John Singer as Harold Bull  
 H. F. Maltby as Sergeant Bull  
 Ivor Barnard as Mayor 
 Jenny Laird as Daisy Pennyfeather 
 Robert Adair as Lord Bromwich  
 Frederick Bradshaw as Walter Walkeling  
 Frank Cochrane as Simpkins  
 Francesca Bahrle
 Sybil Grove
 Alfred Wellesley

References

Bibliography
 Low, Rachael. Filmmaking in 1930s Britain. George Allen & Unwin, 1985.
 Wood, Linda. British Films, 1927-1939. British Film Institute, 1986.

External links

1938 films
British comedy films
1938 comedy films
Films shot at Beaconsfield Studios
Films directed by Edmond T. Gréville
British black-and-white films
Films scored by Walter Goehr
1930s English-language films
1930s British films